The 2011 Campbell Fighting Camels football team represented Campbell University in the 2011 NCAA Division I FCS football season. The Fighting Camels were led by fourth-year head coach Dale Steele and played their home games at Barker–Lane Stadium. They are a member of the Pioneer Football League. They finished the season 6–5, 5–3 in PFL play to finish in fourth place.

Schedule

References

Campbell
Campbell Fighting Camels football seasons
Campbell Fighting Camels football